Henri Matisse’s Jazz is a limited-edition art book containing prints of colorful cut-paper collages, accompanied by the artist's written thoughts. It was first issued on September 30, 1947, by art publisher Tériade. The portfolio, characterized by vibrant colors, poetic texts, and circus and theater themes, marks Matisse's transition to a new form of medium.

Original creation
Diagnosed with abdominal cancer in 1941, Matisse underwent surgery that left him chair- and bedbound. Limited in mobility, he could no longer paint or sculpt. Instead, he cut forms from colored paper that he arranged as collages, and decoupage which became known as the “cut-outs”.

That same year, at the age of 74, Matisse began Jazz. His assistants helped prepare the collages for printing, using a stencil process known as pochoir in French. He worked on the series for two years, utilizing this new method that linked drawing and color—two important elements in Matisse's work.

The designs were initially intended as covers for Verve, a French art magazine published by Tériade. In 1947, Tériade issued the compositions in an artist's portfolio. Tériade gave it the title Jazz, which Matisse liked because it suggested a connection between art and musical improvisation. Despite the low number of books printed, Jazz was well received.

The circus, the title originally suggested for the book, provided inspiration for the majority of the motifs concerning performing artists and balancing acts. “These images, with their lively and violent tones, derive from crystallizations of memories of circuses, folktales, and voyages,” Matisse explains in the accompanying text. The figure of the circus artist, usually depicted alone, is often seen as a metaphor for the artist himself.

The first prints illustrating the circus do not seem to have an immediate connection to the succeeding works. However, these compositions are viewed as metaphors of life. The overall themes in Jazz derive from biographical elements, such as Matisse's recollection of his travels to Tahiti in the three "Lagoon" sheets (XVII–XIX), as well as broader aspects including love (V, VI), death (X), and fate (XVI).

List of prints
The titles of the individual sheets, together with supplementary explanations by his assistant Lydia Delectorskaya, in English translation, are:

See also
 Composition for "Jazz" (Albert Gleizes)

References and sources
References

Sources

Jazz by Henri Matisse, introduction by Riva Castleman, George Braziller 1983 
Jazz by Henri Matisse, introduction by Dominique Szymusiak, Editions Anthese 2005

External links
Greg Kucera essay on Jazz by Henri Matisse
Jazz title page, Sword Swallower, Icarus, The Cowboy by Henri Matisse

Artists' books
Henri Matisse
1947 books
Prestel Publishing books